IserveU is a non-profit, direct democracy organization and web-based voting platform founded in Yellowknife, Northwest Territories, Canada.  It is currently the only system in the world with an elected representative in office.  The organization strives to increase citizen engagement,  transparency and accountability in government through crowdsourcing decision-making to the voting public of Yellowknife.

Formation
Initially conceived of in 2012 by Paige Saunders it was intended to introduce a form of e-democracy to Yellowknife, IserveU has since become a fully fledged web-based voting platform and volunteer driven organization, orchestrating public events and canvassing. In a letter from one of the organization's founding members, it is stated that prior to the election, IserveU operated through volunteers and a small staff.

Voting platform
The IserveU voting platform functions as a way to incorporate elements of direct democracy into a representative system, by obligating city council incumbents to vote in accordance with the outcome of online votes – effectively creating a way for the public to directly decide the fate of their city.

Councillors seeking greater citizen input into decision making post all current motions before the council, on the IserveU site. These motions could be detailed, debated and voted on by the registered userbase before the outcome is taken to council. Councillors themselves can vote on issues with the weight of the currently 'uncast' votes. That is, the outcome of a motion that has very little public participation will largely be decided by the votes of the councillors, as the votes in the uncast vote pool are equally divided between them. Whereas, a motion that has garnered a large amount of public participation will have a reduced number of uncast votes for the  councillors to use, reducing the councillors' impact.

The system is still being modified to meet new concerns, and has been released under an open source license on GitHub, to allow even greater public scrutiny and control.

Inauguration

On the 19th of October, 2015, Rommel Silverio was elected into council, making Yellowknife the official debut of the IserveU e-democracy platform. He will enter office for a three-year term starting on November 2, 2015.

References

Organizations based in the Northwest Territories
Yellowknife
E-democracy